Storm Nelson was a character in the eponymous strip in the British comic Eagle.

Biography
A former officer of the Royal Navy, Commander Nelson owned the ship Silver Spray, part of the Silver Fleet. This fleet included at various times an amphibious motor launch ("Silver Foam") and a helicopter ("Silver Hawk") - all named Silver ** as well as a small submarine ("Silver Fish").

Nelson's versatile crew included Jonah McCann from the town of Auchtermuchty in Scotland, the radio operator, Bash Callaghan, who was the pilot of the ship's helicopter, Spanner Dodds, the ship's engineer, and a ship's boy known as Kerfuffle Kidd who was working for his Master's ticket.

The fleet seemed to spend much of its time in the West Indies and the Pacific, visiting islands occupied by ex-British colonial peoples. They righted wrongs and confronted nasty characters who dared to threaten peaceful island communities.

Comic strip history
The strip ran from October 1953 to March 1962. It was drawn by Richard Jennings, with scripts for the earlier stories by Guy Morgan (under the pen name Edward Trice), and later Jennings wrote the stories as well.

Eagle comic strips
Eagle (comic) characters